The 1890–91 Rugby Union County Championship was the third edition of England's premier rugby union club competition at the time.

Lancashire won the competition for the first time, winning all ten of their county fixtures during the season, which included beating the three teams declared champions of their respective divisional groups.

Draw and Results

Group Winners

Championship Series

Squad
 M Atkinson (Wigan)
 John Berry (Tyldesley)
 T Brayshaw (Wigan)
 Walter Bumby (Swinton)
 Tom Coop (Leigh)
 T Craven (Salford)
 W Cross (St Helens)
 E H Flower (Broughton)
 Dai Gwynne (Oldham)
 Tom Kent (Salford)
 James Holt Marsh (Swinton)
 William McCutcheon (Oldham)
 James Pyke (St Helens Recreation RLFC)
 C Rome (Broughton)
 T Rothwell (Swinton)
 J Strang (Liverpool)
 Jim Valentine (Swinton)
 T Whittaker (Manchester)
 R P Wilson (Liverpool Old Boys)

See also
 English rugby union system
 Rugby union in England

References

Rugby Union County Championship
County Championship (rugby union) seasons